The 2014–15 season is Petrolul Ploiești's 85th season in the Romanian football league system, and their fourth consecutive season in the Liga I. Petrolul came third in the 2013–14 Liga I, earning a place in the UEFA Europa League second qualifying round.

Month by month review

June
Petrolul signed a one-year kit deal with American sportswear company Nike, after the association with Puma came to an end. Also, Acıbadem Healthcare Group became the team's medical sponsor until the end of the season, with an extension option being available. Gevaro Nepomuceno, Patrick N'Koyi, George Mareș, Jean-Alain Fanchone, Alberto Cobrea, Mirel Bolboașă, Andrei Peteleu and Mourad Satli were transferred to Petrolul. Roberto Alecsandru and Alexandru Radu were also promoted from the academy.

July
On 7 July, Petrolul announced that they had signed winger Victoraș Astafei on a free transfer. On 20 July, using many players that would normally be substitutes and having a player sent off in the second half, Petrolul was beaten by Universitatea Cluj in the Cupa Ligii round of 16, a competition which was reenacted after fourteen years of pause. In Europa League, "The Yellow Wolves" eliminated Flamurtari Vlorë 5–1 on aggregate. On 27 July, Petrolul confirmed on its official website that Opel will continue being the shirt sponsor until the end of the season.

August
Petrolul had bad luck at the Europa League third qualifying round draw, confronting Czech side Viktoria Plzeň, a club which in the previous season took part in the Champions League group stage. After a draw at Ploiești (1–1), "The Yellow Wolves" impressively beat Viktoria scoring four goals and conceding only one. The Romanian side's captain, 35-year-old Adrian Mutu, played a big role in his team's qualification, scoring both home and away. However, losing both of the play-off legs against Dinamo Zagreb of Croatia, Petrolul yet again missed the chance of advancing to the group stage.

September
On 3 September, Uruguayan footballers Rodrigo Pastorini and Sebastián Gallegos joined Petrolul's squad. One week later, Ovidiu Hoban was transferred to Israeli club Hapoel Be'er Sheva. He was Petrolul's only Romanian player called by the national team for a match against Greece, which was played on 7 September. Ioan Filip signed with Petrolul to replace Hoban. On 16 September, Răzvan Lucescu was sacked. Gheorghe Mulțescu, who coached Petrolul twice in the past, took his place one day later. On the same day, "The Yellow Wolves" transferred Kristijan Ipša, a Croatian central defender. Mulțescu made his début against rivals Steaua București, on the 21st. Israeli international striker Toto Tamuz scored a double, but unfortunately, Petrolul lost the match 2–3. After many rumours, Adrian Mutu eventually broke his contract with "The Oilmen", on the 26th. He was the best paid footballer, and was often criticised for playing bad. Cosmin Contra, Petrolul's coach from October 2012 to March 2014, said that the signings of Adrian Mutu and Ianis Zicu (both joined in January 2014) were a "failure".

October
On 16 October, Shai Haddad signed a one-year contract with Petrolul, on Toto Tamuz's recommendation.

November
On 25 November, president Daniel Capră, general director Marius Bucuroiu and five other persons faced preventive detention for 24 hours, being suspected of tax evasion and money laundering. The loss would amount to 15.4 million euros. The press suggested that these criminal matters could cause serious financial problems for Petrolul and important players might want to leave the club.

December
Petrolul had the chance to finish the year on the second place of Liga I, but drawn at home against Concordia Chiajna, subsequently keeping the third place.

January
On 10 January 2015, ex-Standard Liège coach Mircea Rednic replaced Gheorghe Mulțescu on the bench. During the winter transfer window, five footballers left Petrolul, including important ones like Juan Albín and Soni Mustivar.

February
At the beginning of February, due to president Capră still being under detention, the club faced financial problems and entered insolvency, meaning that the participation in UEFA Europa League and UEFA Champions League is denied. However, among others, Mircea Rednic convinced 31-year-old striker Mohamed Tchité, who spent most of his professional career in Belgium, with Standard Liége, Anderlecht and Club Brugge, and in Spain with Racing de Santander, to be part of the team until the end of the season at the least.

March
Mohamed Tchité made his début on 5 March in the first leg of the Romanian Cup semi-final against rivals Steaua București, scoring his team's only goal in a 1–1 draw.

April
On 3 April, Petrolul missed the qualification to the Cupa României final for the second year in a row, losing the semi-final second leg against Steaua at Arena Națională. However, only a week later, "The Yellow Wolves" defeated them in the championship, after more than 15 years. Curaçaoan winger Gevaro Nepomuceno netted the only goal of the match.

May
On 5 May, it was announced that manager Mircea Rednic left "The Yellow-Blues". Assistant coach Valentin Sinescu continued as the caretaker of the team. Eventually, Petrolul finished the season on a disappointing place six.

Players

First team squad
At the end of the season.

Transfers

In

Out

Competitions

Overall

Liga I

League table

Results summary

Results by round

Matches

Last updated: 27 May 2015

Cupa României

Round of 32

Round of 16

Quarter-finals

Semi-finals

Last updated: 5 April 2015

Cupa Ligii

Round of 16

Last updated: 21 July 2014

UEFA Europa League

Qualifying rounds

Second qualifying round

Third qualifying round

Play-off round

Last updated: 29 August 2014

Squad statistics

Goals
Updated as of 27 May 2015.

1 Includes qualifying rounds and play-off round.

Pre-season and friendlies

Last updated: 15 February 2015

See also

2014–15 Cupa României
2014–15 Cupa Ligii
2014–15 Liga I
2014–15 UEFA Europa League

Notes and references

FC Petrolul Ploiești seasons
Petrolul Ploiesti season
Petrolul Ploiesti